Diário de Coimbra is the main newspaper of Coimbra, Portugal.

Its current editor-in-chief is Adriano Callé Lucas.

Newspapers published in Portugal
Mass media in Coimbra
Publications established in 1931
1931 establishments in Portugal